Pritchardia viscosa, the stickybud pritchardia  or loulu, is an extremely rare endangered species of Pritchardia palm that is endemic to the Hawaiian island of Kauai.

Associated plants include aiea (Ilex anomala), ahakea (Bobea spp.), hame, (Antidesma spp.), hāpuu pulu (Cibotium glacum), and kōpiko (Psychotria hexandra).

Like the related Nihoa Fan Palm (P. remota), it is susceptible to extinction by a single catastrophic event because of its wild population of four individuals. It is threatened by introduced rats, which eat the seeds. It has been cultivated to a moderate extent, but is exceptionally limited in its habitat.

References

External links
PACSOA: Pritchardia viscosa
ARKive: Images of life on Earth

viscosa
Endemic flora of Hawaii
Biota of Kauai
Trees of Hawaii
Taxa named by Odoardo Beccari